Monireh Gorji is an Iranian teacher and mujtahid. She was the only woman to be elected to the 73-seats Assembly of Experts for Constitution in 1979.

References

1930 births
Possibly living people
Islamic Republican Party politicians
Iranian educators
20th-century Muslim scholars of Islam
20th-century Iranian women politicians
20th-century Iranian politicians
Iranian people of Georgian descent
Women scholars of Islam
Members of the Assembly of Experts for Constitution